Robert George White (born 15 September 1995) is an English cricketer who plays for Middlesex County Cricket Club. A wicket-keeper, who is a right-handed batsman, who also bowls right-arm medium pace. He made his first-class debut for Loughborough MCC University against Hampshire County Cricket Club in April 2015. He made his List A debut for Middlesex against Australia on 9 June 2018, during Australia's tour of England.

He made his Twenty20 debut for Middlesex in the 2018 t20 Blast on 3 August 2018. In August 2021, in the 2021 County Championship, White scored his maiden century in first-class cricket.

References

External links
 

1995 births
Living people
People from Ealing
English cricketers
Middlesex cricketers
Loughborough MCCU cricketers
Essex cricketers